Bagnacavallo is a town and comune in the province of Ravenna, Emilia-Romagna, Italy.

The Renaissance painter Bartolomeo Ramenghi bore the nickname of his native city.

Main sights
Castellaccio (15th century)
 Giardino dei Semplici
Podere Pantaleone, a  natural preserve
Piazza della Libertà, the town's main square

Twin towns and sister cities
Bagnacavallo's twin towns and sister cities are:
 Neresheim, Germany, since 1994
 Strzyżów, Poland, since 2006
 Stone, United Kingdom (friendship), since 2004
 Aix-en-Othe, France, since 2012
 Pollutri, since 2019 (friendship)

References

Cities and towns in Emilia-Romagna